Waldfriedhof is German for woodland cemetery. Cemeteries called Waldfriedhof include

 Munich Waldfriedhof, Munich
 Waldfriedhof Dahlem, Berlin
 Waldfriedhof Zehlendorf, Berlin

See also 
 Woodland Cemetery (disambiguation)